Walter Neubrand is one of three men, called the Keepers of the Cup, currently in charge of keeping and maintaining the Stanley Cup during its many trips around the world.

Early life
Neubrand was born in Toronto, Ontario, in June 1969, where he grew up as an avid hockey fan. He learned how to play the sport on the frozen Credit River during his childhood. Neubrand also enjoyed playing baseball as a child, but always remained a hockey fan first and foremost. After finishing high school at Port Credit Secondary School, he went on to study at the University of Waterloo where he received an honours degree in Environmental Studies. In 1995, he graduated with a Bachelor of Education degree from the University of Toronto.

Hockey Hall of Fame
After graduating from university, Neubrand got a job working for the Hockey Hall of Fame in 1995, where he started out working as a guest services associate. In 1997, however, Neubrand got to work with the Stanley Cup for the first time when he was asked to help accompany the Cup to Scotty Bowman's home in Buffalo, NY after his team, the Detroit Red Wings, had won the 1997 Stanley Cup Playoffs. Aside from a brief absence in 2000, he has been a Keeper of the Cup ever since.

In 1999, Neubrand would accompany the cup to Tampa Bay, where the 1999 NHL All-Star Game was taking place. It was here where he met his wife Laura for the first time, and they later married in South Lyon, Michigan, on August 23, 2003.

The year 2000 saw Neubrand leave the Hockey Hall of Fame to become a police officer with the Peel Regional Police. He would go on to graduate from the academy he attended, but realized soon after that being a police officer wasn't the right career choice for him, and promptly returned to his former position.

Currently, Neubrand is one of three Keepers of the Cup (the other two being Phil Pritchard and Mike Blot), who share the duties of the Keeper on a rotational basis.

During his time off, Neubrand teaches multiple grades in Mississauga, Ontario at Bristol Road Middle School, and has been teaching with the Peel District School Board since 2002. Neubrand is an avid fan of The Simpsons, enjoys camping in Algonquin Park, and has been living in Hamilton since 2003. He and his wife have two girls, one named Brooke (born November 2007) and the other, Karleigh (born February 2010). His favourite team is the Toronto Maple Leafs.

See also
 List of University of Waterloo people

References 

1969 births
Living people
People from Toronto
Stanley Cup